Korattur railway station is a railway station on the Chennai Central–Arakkonam section of the Chennai Suburban Railway Network. Located 12 km from Chennai Central railway station, the station serves the neighbourhoods of Korattur, Kolathur and Padi. It has an elevation of 12.85 m above sea level. It is situated in the western part of Chennai.

History

The first lines in the station were electrified on 29 November 1979, with the electrification of the Chennai Central–Tiruvallur section. Additional lines at the station were electrified on 2 October 1986, with the electrification of the Villivakkam–Avadi section.

Layout
The station has four tracks, two exclusively for suburban trains. The suburban tracks are served by a side platform and an island platform. The station's entrance and the ticket counter are located on the side platform. The platforms are connected by means of a footbridge for pedestrians.

Traffic
On an average, suburban trains on the western rail route between Chennai Central and Arakkonam make about 260 trips through the station. As of 2018, more than 43,000 passengers board trains at the Korattur railway station every day. The Korattur station chiefly serves college students and industrial workers from the Ambattur Industrial Estate.

Developments
A subway to replace level crossing no. 4 at the railway station has been planned at a cost of  112.5 million, for which tenders have been finalised.

See also

 Chennai Suburban Railway
 Railway stations in Chennai

References

External links

 Korattur station at Indiarailinfo.com

Stations of Chennai Suburban Railway
Railway stations in Chennai